Sungai Padi Road (Thanon Sungai Padi) or National highway 4056 is a major road in Narathiwat Province of Thailand.

List of Junctions and Towns 

National highways in Thailand